The Church of Saint Anthony of Padua is a Roman Catholic church in Busovača, Bosnia and Herzegovina.

References

Busovaca
Roman Catholic churches completed in 1885
19th-century Roman Catholic church buildings in Bosnia and Herzegovina